Rikke Poulsen (born 20 April 1986) is a former Danish handball player. She represented Danish national team at the 2013 World Women's Handball Championship in Serbia.

References

External links

Danish female handball players
1986 births
Living people
People from Holstebro
Viborg HK players
Sportspeople from the Central Denmark Region